Mark Jacob Lowery (born July 21, 1990) is an American professional baseball coach and former baseball catcher who is the manager for the Fredericksburg Nationals. Prior to playing professionally, Lowery played college baseball for James Madison University.

Playing career
Lowery played Little League Baseball in Huguenot, Virginia. At the age of 13, he began playing for travel baseball teams during the summer.

Lowery attended Cosby High School in Midlothian, Virginia, and played for the school's baseball team. In his senior year, he had a .381 batting average with seven home runs, 28 runs batted in (RBIs), and 40% caught stealing percentage. He enrolled at James Madison University, where he played college baseball for the James Madison Dukes in the Colonial Athletic Association (CAA). He was named a second team All-CAA catcher as a sophomore. In 2011, his junior year, Lowery batted .359 with 24 home runs and 91 RBIs. Lowery was named the CAA Player of the Year and a first team All-CAA catcher, while he was named an All-American by Collegiate Baseball and Baseball America. In 2011, Lowery won the Johnny Bench Award, given to the best catcher in college baseball.

The Cleveland Indians selected Lowery in the fourth round of the 2011 Major League Baseball Draft. After he signed with the Indians, Lowery was assigned to the Mahoning Valley Scrappers of the Class A-Short Season New York–Penn League, where he batted .245 with six home runs and 43 RBIs in 69 games. He was the 17th best prospect according to Baseball America. In 2012, Lowery played for the Lake County Captains of the Class A Midwest League and the Carolina Mudcats of the Class A-Advanced Carolina League, where he combined to hit nine home runs with 53 RBIs. He began the 2013 season with Carolina, and was promoted to the Akron RubberDucks of the Class AA Eastern League in late April. The Indians invited Lowery to spring training in 2014, and assigned him Akron. The Indians invited Lowery to spring training in 2015. Lowery was released by the Indians on March 28, 2016. Lowery signed a Free agent deal with the Washington Nationals in April 2016. He elected free agency and re-signed with the Washington Nationals in October 2016. He elected free agency in November 2018. In late December, Lowery re-signed to a minor league contract with the Nationals. Lowery elected free agency, signed with Washington Nationals for the 2019 season. He was in AA with the Harrisburg Senators. Lowery elected free agency in November 2019. He re-signed with the Washington Nationals for the 2020 baseball season.

Coaching career
In 2021, Lowery served as the manager of the Florida Complex League Nationals. In 2022, he was promoted to manager of the Fredericksburg Nationals of the Low-A Carolina League.

Personal life
Lowery's younger brother, Luke, played college baseball for East Carolina University. Their father, Tim, is the baseball coach at Cosby High School. Their mother, Lori, is a high school Spanish teacher.

References

External links

1990 births
Living people
People from Midlothian, Virginia
Baseball players from Virginia
Baseball catchers
James Madison Dukes baseball players
All-American college baseball players
Mahoning Valley Scrappers players
Lake County Captains players
Carolina Mudcats players
Akron Aeros players
Akron RubberDucks players
Peoria Javelinas players
Harrisburg Senators players
Potomac Nationals players
Syracuse Chiefs players